Libby Graham (born 12 September 1997) is an Australian rules footballer playing for the Richmond Football Club in the AFL Women's (AFLW). 

Graham was drafted by Greater Western Sydney with their third selection and forty second overall in the 2020 AFL Women's draft. 

She made her debut against  at Manuka Oval in the sixth round of the 2021 season.

She was traded to Richmond by Greater Western Sydney at the 2022 AFL Women's draft in exchange for Draft pick 68.  

She made her debut for Richmond against  at GMHBA Stadium in the first round of AFL Women's season seven.

Statistics
Statistics are correct to end S7 (2022)

|-
| 2021 ||  
| 37 || 3 || 0 || 0 || 13 || 6 || 19 || 6 || 4 || 0.0 || 0.0 || 4.3 || 2.0 || 6.3 || 2.0 || 1.3 
|-
| 2022 ||  
| 37 || 3 || 0 || 0 || 10 || 11 || 21 || 5 || 8 || 0.0 || 0.0 || 3.3 || 3.7 || 7.0 || 1.7 || 2.7 
|-
| S7 (2022) || 
| 18  || 12 || 0 || 0 || 65 || 10 || 75 || 16 || 14 || 0.0 || 0.0 || 5.4 || 0.8 || 6.3 || 1.3 || 1.2
|- 
|- class="sortbottom"
! colspan=3| Career
! 12
! 0
! 0
! 88
! 27
! 115
! 27
! 26
! 0.0
! 0.0
! 4.9
! 1.5
! 6.4
! 1.5
! 1.4
|}

References

External links

1997 births
Living people
Richmond Football Club (AFLW) players
Australian rules footballers from New South Wales